At First Sight is a 1917 American silent comedy film directed by Robert Z. Leonard and written by George Middleton. The film stars Mae Murray, Sam Hardy, Jules Raucourt, Julia Bruns, William T. Carleton, and Nellie Lindrith. The film was released on July 2, 1917, by Paramount Pictures.

Plot

Cast 
Mae Murray as Justina
Sam Hardy as Hartly Poole 
Jules Raucourt as Paul
Julia Bruns as Nell
William T. Carleton as Mr. Chaffin 
Nellie Lindrith as Mrs. chaffin 
William J. Butler as The Sheriff
Eddie Sturgis as The Deputy 
Estar Banks	
Charles Ogle

References

External links 
 

1917 films
1910s English-language films
Silent American comedy films
1917 comedy films
Paramount Pictures films
Films directed by Robert Z. Leonard
American black-and-white films
American silent feature films
1910s American films